The Set-Up is a 1995 American crime thriller film directed by Strathford Hamilton and starring Billy Zane. It was based on the 1977 novel My Laugh Comes Last by James Hadley Chase.

Plot 

Charlie Thorpe (Billy Zane), a security systems expert, is caught during a robbery. When he get released from prison, a bank owner hires him to design a fool-proof system during the refurbishing of his bank. After he has completed the system, he begins getting blackmailed, to break his system.

Cast 

 Billy Zane as Charles Thorpe
 Mia Sara as Gina Sands
 James Russo as Kliff
 James Coburn as Jeremiah Cole
 Louis Mandylor as Pauly
 Tommy 'Tiny' Lister as Leon (as Tiny 'Zeus' Lister)
 Mark Rolston as Ray Harris
 Margaret Avery as Olivia Dubois
 Lisa Collins as Elizabeth
 Vince Deadrick Jr. as Officer Jones
 Shannon Wilcox as Mrs. Cole
 Paula O'Hara as Julia (as Paula Coburn)
 Ed Wasser as Cop #1
 Brent Morris as Cop #2
 Tom Muzila as Boxer
 Stephen Lofaro as Manager
 Roy Jenson as Older Guard
 Kevin McLaughlin as Young Guard
 Scott L. Schwartz as Maniac (uncredited)

Release 
It debuted on the American premium television network Showtime on July 23, 1995.

Reception 
Time Out reviewed the film, writing that it was "a movie that's more plot than characterisation, and is already doomed from the moment they cast the synthetic male lead." Variety and TV Guide also reviewed The Set-Up, the latter of which felt that "Persuasively acted by veteran smoothie James Coburn and the two romantic leads, THE SET-UP is knocked down a few pegs by the robbers--Mandylor, who seethes with "method" menace; former wrestler Tiny Lister, a Tor Johnson for the '90s, and the hammy Russo, who seems on a pilgrimage to showcase the worst aspects of Method-acted hooliganism in all his performances. " Of Coburn, a reviewer for The Age noted that "the veteran film heavy deserves better."

References

External links 

 

1995 films
1995 crime thriller films
1990s heist films
American crime thriller films
American heist films
Films based on British novels
Films based on crime novels
Films based on works by James Hadley Chase
Metro-Goldwyn-Mayer films
1990s English-language films
Films directed by Strathford Hamilton
1990s American films